Ligurta is a populated place situated in Yuma County, Arizona, United States. It is located in the Dome Valley south of the Gila River. Established as a railroad station on the Sunset Route circa 1880,

Etymology

The name Ligurta could be derived from the Spanish word for "lizard", lagarto.

References

Populated places in Yuma County, Arizona